Since the Paralympic Games began in 1960, there have been 15 Summer Paralympic Games held in 13 separate cities and 11 Winter Paralympic Games held in 10 separate cities. Six cities have been chosen by the International Olympic Committee (IOC) and the International Paralympic Committee (IPC) to host the upcoming Paralympics: Tokyo for the 2020 Summer Paralympics, Beijing for the 2022 Winter Paralympics, Paris for the 2024 Summer Paralympics, Milan-Cortina d'Ampezzo for the 2026 Winter Paralympics, Los Angeles for the 2028 Summer Paralympics, and Brisbane for the 2032 Summer Paralympics.

Three cities have hosted or are scheduled to host a Paralympic Games more than once; Innsbruck in 1984 and 1988, Beijing in 2008 (summer games) and 2022 (winter games), and Tokyo in 1964 and 2020.

The United States hosted three games (one was held in both the US and the UK) and Japan hosted its third games in 2020. Austria, Norway, Italy, the United Kingdom, and Canada have each hosted two games. 

The games have primarily been hosted on the continent of Europe (14 games). Four games have been hosted in Asia and five in North America, and one game has been hosted in the region of Oceania. (The 1984 Summer Paralympics were held in both the US and the UK). Rio de Janeiro's winning bid for 2016 will be the third Americas host.  No Paralympic Games have been hosted in the continents of Africa and Antarctica.

Host cities are selected by the International Olympic Committee (IOC) and the International Paralympic Committee (IPC). Currently, they are selected seven years in advance. The selection process takes two years. In the first stage of the selection process, any city in the world may submit an application to become a host city. After ten months, the Executive Board of the IOC decides which of these applicant cities will become candidate cities based on the recommendation of a working group that reviews the applications. In the second stage, the candidate cities are investigated thoroughly by an Evaluation Commission, which then submits a final short list of cities to be considered for selection. The host city is then chosen by vote of the IOC Session, a general meeting of IOC members.

Paralympic host cities

Statistics

Host cities for multiple Paralympic Games

Total Paralympic Games by country

Notes

 Although Tel Aviv is located in Asia, Israel is member of European Region of IPC.
 Equestrian events were held in China's Hong Kong SAR. Although Hong Kong's separate NPC conducted the equestrian competition, it was an integral part of the Beijing Games; it is not conducted under a separate bid, flame, etc. The IPC website lists only Beijing as the host city.

References
General
 

Specific

See also
List of Olympic Games host cities

Host cities
Paralympic Games host cities
Host cities